The Chicago Freight Car Leasing Company provides railcar leasing and management to companies throughout North America for a variety of commodities, including agricultural & food products; chemical & processed mineral products; metals, ores, aggregates, mineral rock/stone, and petroleum products. Chicago Freight Car Leasing is a subsidiary of Sasser Family Holdings, Inc.. Other related companies under Sasser Family Holdings include Union Leasing, CF Asia Pacific, CFCL Australia, CF Rail Services, and NxGen Rail.

Australia

A daughter company, CFCL Australia, owns and leases the largest private fleet of locomotives and wagons in the Australian market. The company was established in response to the privatization of the former state-based railways in that country.

References

External links
 
 CFCLA 

Rail freight transportation in the United States
Service companies of the United States
Rolling stock leasing companies
Rail freight companies